Open system may refer to:

Technical term 
 Open system (computing), one of a class of computers and associated software that provides some combination of interoperability, portability and open software standards, particularly Unix and Unix-like systems
 Open system (systems theory), in the natural and social sciences, a process that exchanges material, energy, people, capital or information with its environment
 Open system (thermodynamics), in thermodynamics and physics, a system where matter and energy can enter or leave, in contrast to a closed system where energy can enter or leave but matter can not
 Open system (control theory), a feedforward system that does not have any feedback loop to control its output in a control system
 Open system, in management science a system that is capable of self-maintenance on the basis of throughput of resources from the environment
 Open and closed system in social science
 Open system of learning, where information is sourced from multiple sources
 Open government, system
 Open-system environment reference model, one of the first reference models for enterprise architecture
 Open Distribution system (Example: Peer-to-peer file sharing system)

Proper name 
 Open Systems Interconnection (IT company)
 Open Systems Accounting Software (product), an accounting and business software
 Open Systems International, supplier of open automation solutions for utilities in the electric, oil & gas, transport, and water industries
 Open Systems AG, a company headquartered in Zurich, Switzerland 
 Open-source software, system (product)
 Open publication, system (non-standard term)

The system in which the exchange of both mass and energy take place through surrounding environment